The Farr 727 is a trailerable sailboat that was designed by New Zealander Bruce Farr as an International Offshore Rule Quarter Ton class racer and first built in 1976. The boat was also built in Canada as the North Star 727.

The boat's designation indicates its approximate length overall in decimetres.

Production
The design was built by Alpha Marine in New Zealand, Chantier Mallard in France and by North Star Yachts in Canada, starting in 1976. A total of 76 boats were built by Alpha and Mallard, but it is now out of production. The moulds used by North Star came from Alpha in New Zealand, but without royalties paid to the designer.

Design

The Farr 727 is a recreational keelboat, built predominantly of fibreglass, with wood trim. It has a fractional sloop rig, a raked stem, a reverse transom, a skeg-mounted rudder controlled by a tiller and a fixed fin keel.

The design has sleeping accommodation for five people, with a double "V"-berth in the bow cabin, a straight settee in the main cabin and two quarter berths aft. The galley is located on the port side amidships and is equipped with a two-burner stove and a sink. The head is located in the bow cabin on the port side under the "V"-berth.

For sailing downwind the design may be equipped with a symmetrical spinnaker.

Variants
Farr 727
This model was built by Alpha and Mallard. It displaces  and carries  of ballast.
North Star 727
This model was built by North Star. It displaces  and carries  of ballast.

Operational history
The boat is supported by an active class club that organizes racing events, the Quarter Ton Class.

The design prototype, named 45 South, won the Quarter Ton Cup in 1975.

During the JOG Tasman Cup on 15 April 1983, four boats sunk, including the Farr 727 Waikikamukau. One of the four crew members drowned in the sinking, due to the rapid filling of the boat and being tethered to the hull.

See also
List of sailing boat types

References

External links

Keelboats
1970s sailboat type designs
Sailing yachts
Trailer sailers
Sailboat type designs by Bruce Farr
Sailboat types built by Alpha Marine
Sailboat types built by Chantier Mallard
Sailboat types built by Hughes Boat Works